Shingay cum Wendy is a civil parish in the English county of Cambridgeshire, around 5 miles (8 km) north west of Royston.

Forming part of the district of South Cambridgeshire's Bassingbourn Ward the parish's main settlements are Shingay and Wendy.

As Shingay cum Wendy has a low number of electors the affairs of the parish are run by the parish meeting system.

History
The parish historically consisted of two separate parishes: Shingay and Wendy. The parish's straight eastern boundary with Whaddon follows the Roman Ermine Street (now the A1198), and its northern boundary with Croydon and Arrington follows the winding course of the River Cam. Its south and western borders with Bassingbourn, Abington Pigotts, and Steeple Morden largely follow field boundaries.

RAF Bassingbourn covers a portion of the south-eastern part of the parish, and was built just prior to the Second World War.

For additional history, see the pages for Shingay and Wendy.

References

External links 
Village website

Civil parishes in Cambridgeshire
South Cambridgeshire District